Anacardium giganteum, also known as cajui, of the family Anacardiaceae are the trees that are huge and occur usually in the upland rainforest and sometimes appear in the high flood plains that holds the soil, resistant to water-log.

References

External links

giganteum